The 2022 Liga 3 was the 6th season under its current title and the 34th season of third tier football in Georgia. The regular two-round tournament began on 4 April and ended on 1 December with promotion play-offs completed in 10 December.

Review
Based on GFF decision, the number of Liga 3 clubs was increased from 14 to 16 teams for this season. In contrast with the previous year, three teams were relegated, two clubs gained automatic promotion and two more qualified for play-offs.

Both unbeaten at home, Dinamo-2 and Kolkheti 1913 sealed their promotion three rounds before the end of the season.  Kolkheti Khobi joined them after the play-offs.    

Chikhura continued their horrible run in this league as well. Rooted to the foot of the table with a single point in thirty games, they suffered three relegations in three successive seasons. Zestafoni, who faced financial difficulties after mid-season, also failed to stay up. Six more teams fought hard to avoid relegation. Eventually, Meshakhte, the last of the three Imeretian clubs, lost a crucial final match and ended up in the drop zone.

Team changes
The following teams have changed division since the previous season:

To Liga 3

Promoted from Liga 4

Borjomi • Dinamo-2 • Irao • Zestafoni

Relegated from Liga 2

Chikhura

From Liga 3

Relegated to Liga 4

Magaroeli • Didube

Promoted to Liga 2

Spaeri

Teams and Stadiums

Six former first-tier teams were competing in Liga 3 this season, namely Borjomi (2005-09), Chikhura Sachkhere (2012-20), Guria Lanchkhuti (1990–99, 2001–02, 2013–16), Kolkheti-1913 Poti (1990-2006, 2010-2013, 2014–18), Kolkheti Khobi (1990–92, 1999–2000) and Zestafoni (2004-15).

Clubs represented in the league this season are listed below in alphabetical order: 

Note: OMC stands for Olympic Preparation Centre while SC means Football Centre.

League table

Results

Regular season

Promotion play-offs
First leg

Second leg

Following these matches Kolkheti Khobi achieved promotion to Erovnuli Liga 2, while Aragvi remained in Liga 3 for the next season.

References

External links 
 
 Soccerway.com

Liga 3 (Georgia) seasons
3
Georgia
Georgia